Cicely, Lady Arundell of Wardour (née Compton, c. 161024 March 1676) was the wife of Henry Arundell, 3rd Baron Arundell of Wardour of Wardour Castle.

She was the daughter of the Hon. Sir Henry Compton KB, of Brambletye, Sussex. She firstly married Sir John Fermor, of Somerton, Oxfordshire and secondly Baron Arundell.

They had 3 children:
 Hon Thomas Arundell, later 4th Baron Arundell of Wardour
 Hon Henry Arundell
 Hon Cicely Arundell, who became a nun in Rouen

References

1610 births
1676 deaths
Cicely
Arundell of Wardour
Cicely
17th-century English women